The 2017–18 Manhattan Jaspers basketball team represented Manhattan College during the 2017–18 NCAA Division I men's basketball season. The Jaspers, led by seventh-year head coach Steve Masiello, played their home games at Draddy Gymnasium in Riverdale, New York as members of the Metro Atlantic Athletic Conference. They finished the season 14–17, 9–9 in MAAC play to finish in a tie for fifth place. As the No. 5 seed in the MAAC tournament, they lost in the quarterfinals to Iona.

Previous season
The Jaspers finished the 2016–17 season 10–22, 5–15 in MAAC play to finish in a tie for tenth place. They lost in the first round of the MAAC tournament to Rider.

Roster

Schedule and results

|-
!colspan=9 style=| Exhibition

|-
!colspan=9 style=| Non-conference regular season

|-
!colspan=9 style=| MAAC regular season

|-
!colspan=9 style=| MAAC tournament

References

Manhattan Jaspers basketball seasons
Manhattan
Manhattan
Manhattan